Limonata is a 2015 Turkish comedy film directed by Ali Atay. Part of this story takes place as a road movie from Macedonia to Istanbul and back. This is the story of how two brothers who are initially strangers come to know one another.

Plot 
Middle-aged Sakip goes in search of his half-brother Selim, whom he hadn't known existed until Sakip's father, Suat, at his death bed, asks Sakip to go and get him. He drives from Macedonia to Istanbul, then after many adventures searching for Selim, eventually succeeds in finding him. Then there is the attempt to convince Selim to go and see his long-lost father before he dies, how he finally ends up in the car, and the long drive back from Istanbul, through Turkey and Bulgaria to Macedonia.

Cast 
 Ertan Saban – Sakip
 Serkan Keskin – Selim
 Luran Ahmeti – Fuat, Sakip's uncle
 Funda Eryigit – Nihal, Sakip's (cousin?)
 Bedija Begovska – Sakip's mother
 Zekir Sipahi – Suat, Sakip's father
 Ciguli – Tyre repair shop keeper
 Selahattin Bilal – Ali Riza, former smuggler turned imam
 Deniz Abdula – Bulgarian showman
 Ömer Lekesiz – Assistant Coach or Team Sponsor

References

External links 

2015 comedy films
Turkish comedy films
2010s Turkish-language films